Ralph A. Beezhold (January 8, 1927 – August 3, 2007) was an American businessman and politician.

Born in Chicago, Illinois, Beezhold graduated from Chicago Christian High School. He took business administration and accounting classes in college. He served in the United States Naval Air Corps during World War II and the Korean War II. Beezhold was the owner of Oakton Appliance Service, Inc. He lived with his wife and family in Stickney Township, Cook County, Illinois. He served on the School Board District 11 and was involved with the Republican Party. Beezhold was also involved with the Pipe Fitters Association, AFL-CIO. Beezhold served in the Illinois House of Representatives in 1967 and 1968. Beezhold died in Florida.

Notes

External links

1927 births
2007 deaths
Politicians from Chicago
Military personnel from Illinois
Businesspeople from Illinois
School board members in Illinois
Republican Party members of the Illinois House of Representatives
20th-century American politicians
20th-century American businesspeople